Wittaya Madlam (born 6 October 1985), simply known as Ya, is a Thai professional footballer who plays as a defensive midfielder.

International career

In March, 2015 Wittaya debuted for Thailand in a friendly match against the Singapore.

International

References

External links
 Profile at Goal
https://th.soccerway.com/players/wittaya-madlam/287709/

1985 births
Living people
Wittaya Madlam
Wittaya Madlam
Association football midfielders
Wittaya Madlam
Wittaya Madlam
Wittaya Madlam
Wittaya Madlam
Wittaya Madlam
Wittaya Madlam
Wittaya Madlam